Enrico Torre (7 October 1901 – 31 May 1975) was an Italian sprinter and long jumper. Torre participated at two editions of the Summer Olympics (1924 and 1928).

National titles
Enrico Torre has won three time the individual national championship.
1 win on 200 metres (1925)
1 win on Long jump (1927)
1 win on Pentathlon (1934)

See also
200 metres winners of Italian Athletics Championships

References

External links
 

1901 births
1975 deaths
Athletes (track and field) at the 1924 Summer Olympics
Athletes (track and field) at the 1928 Summer Olympics
Italian male sprinters
Italian male long jumpers
Olympic athletes of Italy
Italian Athletics Championships winners